Lagrida rufa is a species of beetle in the family Cerambycidae. It was described by Karl Jordan in 1894. It is known from Cameroon, Ghana, the Republic of the Congo, and the Democratic Republic of the Congo.

References

Crossotini
Beetles described in 1894